Oviston is a settlement in Walter Sisulu Local Municipality in Joe Gqabi District Municipality in the Eastern Cape province of South Africa.

Township 8 km north of Venterstad, on the southern bank of the Gariep Dam. It was established in 1964-65 to accommodate workers on the Orange-Fish River Tunnel. The name is derived from the Afrikaans Oranje-Vis-tonnel, ‘Orange-Fish Tunnel’, near the entrance to which it is situated.

See also
 Oviston Nature Reserve

References

Populated places in the Walter Sisulu Local Municipality
Tourist attractions in the Eastern Cape